Water rat(s) may refer to:

Animals
Water rat is a common name for a number of not closely related types of semiaquatic rodents of superfamily Muroidea, including:
Ucayali water rat or amphibious rat (Amphinectomys savamis), a cricetid found in Peru
European water vole (Arvicola amphibius, formerly A. terrestris), a cricetid in north and central Europe and Russia
Baiyankamys, a murid genus of two species from New Guinea
African wading rat (Colomys goslingi), also called African water rat
Earless water rat  (Crossomys moncktoni), a murid of eastern New Guinea
Hydromys, a murid genus of four species of Australia and New Guinea
Nectomys, a cricetid genus of five species of South America
Florida water rat or round-tailed muskrat (Neofiber alleni), a cricetid in the United States
Sulawesi water rat (Waiomys mamasae), a murid of Sulawesi
False water rat (Xeromys myoides), a murid of northern Australia and southern New Guinea

Other
Water Rats (TV series), an Australian police procedural drama originally airing from 1996 to 2001 and focusing on the Sydney Water Police
The Grand Order of Water Rats, an entertainment industry charity based in London, England
The Rat zodiac sign is associated with the element of water
The nickname of the 3rd Canadian Infantry Division
Ratty (water vole), a character in the novel The Wind in the Willows
De Walrot, Zaanstreek, a windmill moved to IJlst, Friesland in 1828
Monto Water Rats, a music venue in London

Animal common name disambiguation pages